T gauge (1:450 or 1:480) is a model railway scale with a track gauge of , referred from "Three-millimeter gauge" or "Third of N scale". It was introduced at the Tokyo Toy Show in 2006 by KK Eishindo of Japan, and went on sale in 2007. It is the smallest commercial model train scale in the world (with ZZ scale being second smallest). Since mid-2009, Railway Shop (Hong Kong) is the exclusive licensed manufacturer.

The models are powered with a battery-powered throttle (with optional AC adapter) at a maximum output of 4.5 V DC. To improve power pickup and tractive effort, the powered cars are fitted with magnetic wheels, and the track has steel rails.

The first train released is the Japanese 103 series commuter train in different versions. Each standard trainset comes with two powered cars, which are located in the centre of the train. The front and rear cars are equipped with directional headlights. The tiny pantographs are made of etched stainless steel. The Hankyu Railway 9000 EMU Series and the Kiha 40 DMU were added to the line of available trainsets in early 2010, and feature improved mechanisms for better performance.

Points (switches or turnouts) are available in a single length right and left hand with manual or electric throw. Crossovers are made in 30° and 90° in 60mm length. Several miscellaneous track sections are also sold including power, isolating, and level grade crossing. The standard sectional track is "roadbed" style, with integrated ballast, or without roadbed as "fine scale". Track pieces are connected with gold-plated metal rail joiners plus plastic clips in the roadbed. Different types of dummy catenary masts can be attached to the track.

In addition to the trains and track, available accessories include a large variety of scenic items: houses and apartment buildings, figures and animals, trees, bikes, boats and more.  The houses are assembled and pre-painted, with fully detailed interiors that the modeller can install.  The plastic figures, etched metal bikes, and other small items have small pins to make installation on a layout easier; the modeller simply makes a hole and inserts the detail into the hole using a toolkit available from Eishindo.  Road signs, traffic lights and other street furniture is available, as well as a street decoration decal sheet, which comes with a scale ruler to aid the placement of markings and details.

One unusual side-effect of the magnetic wheels of the powered units is that they can climb acute grades (as steep as 45 degrees).

T scale trains may be used with model aeroplanes and model airports in the 1:400/1:500 scale range. Eishindo has been planning to produce a modest line of aeroplanes and accessories of their own.

See also
 Rail transport modelling scales
 ZZ scale

References

http://www.kk-eishindo.co.jp/ The manufacturer—and creator—of T Gauge

External links

 www.tgauge.com, largest online vendor serving customers internationally.
  uwefenk.de, German Railway Models in T Gauge
 TalkingTGauge.net, a discussion forum for T Gauge modelling, techniques and layouts

Model railroad scales